Hasan Abdullah Al-Qurashi (1930s-2004) was a Saudi Arabian poet, author, and diplomat, born in Mecca.

He completed his bachelor's degree in literature at the Saudi Educational Institute, and an honorary doctorate from the University of Arizona.

Al-Qurashi was known to be involved in the fields of literature, culture, and media along with his diplomatic works all together, making him a "litterateur diplomat".

His published collections of poetries include Colourful Smiles (1949) and The Curtains of Rain (1997), his first and final poetical works.

Al-Qurashi died in 2004, in his seventies.

Career 
Al-Qurashi was classified among the poets of the second generation, in addition to one the leaders of contemporary literary movement, where he often leaned into writing free verse rather than rhyming poems.

His works have been translated into a number of languages including:

 French
 English
 Spanish
 Chinese
 Persian
 Italian 
 Greek

Moreover, it was said that he gained his knowledge from the Arab literary movements of Apollo and Mahjar.

Al-Qurashi also wrote for a number of class magazines including Arrisalah, Al-Adeeb, and the Writers, and gave lectures at several Saudi Arabian and Arab universities.

Asides from poetry, Al-Qurashi also worked in storytelling, critique, radio, and television; he was the chief of radio staff in Saudi Arabia's Broadcasting Services, and he was commissioned to work in Cairo Radio for more than a year. And throughout his diplomatic career, he held several positions at the ministries of finance and exterior, where he was chief of commissioner in the second one.

Also, he held the titles of "extraordinary ambassador" and "bureau ambassador", and was the Saudi Arabian ambassador in Sudan, Mauritania, and later on in the ministry of exterior.

Furthermore, he represented Saudi Arabia in a number of festivals and literary conferences held in several cities including:

 Tunis 
 Baghdad 
 Western Tripoli 
 Beirut 
 Rabat  
 Taipei 
 Roma 
 Palermo 
 Dhaka 
 Kuala Lumpur 
 Cairo

Al-Qurashi's Memberships  

 Member of the Arabic Language Academy in Egypt and Jordan
 Member of the Writers' Association in Sudan

List of Publications

Reviews 
Abdel Ilah Jad'a finds that Al-Qurashi's poetry reflects psychological and emotional reactions through the language used which portrays a lively image of what Al-Qurashi is referring to, which gives him the ability to express his feelings openly.

References 

20th-century Saudi Arabian poets
2004 deaths